Antoine Bédard (born c. 1978) is a Canadian electronic musician, best known for his recordings under the stage name Montag.

Originally from Montreal, he sings in both French and English, and is currently residing in Montreal again, after a stint in  Vancouver, British Columbia. He recently completed a tour with The One AM Radio and Lymbyc Systym.

Sometimes referred to as a "laptop musician", he received a grant from the Quebec Arts Council to record and catalogue orchestra instruments. He uses the database—with the sounds sometimes looped and processed—in his live performances, along with his own keyboard playing.

On his 2005 album Alone, Not Alone, he collaborated with hip hop music producer Sixtoo.

His 2007 album, Going Places, includes collaborations with M83, Ida Nilsen, Ghislain Poirier, Final Fantasy and Amy Millan. For the title track, he spliced together sounds that fans from around the world had sent in to him; he credits 70 contributors. An openly gay man, Bédard's song "Best Boy Electric" is a boy-on-boy duet that tells of the romance that prompted his move to Vancouver.

He won a 2008 Jessie Award for Outstanding Sound Design or Original Composition, for his contribution to a production of 4.48 Psychosis.

In 2012, Montag released one single a month, all released by Carpark Records. Each single were accompanied by a music video.

Discography
 Are You a Friend? (2002)
 Objets perdus (EP, 2003)
 Paperworks (EP, 2003)
 Alone, Not Alone (2005)
 Going Places (2007)
 Hibernation (2009)
 Phases (2012)

References

External links
 Montag official site
 Going Places review review in Greek

Canadian electronic musicians
People from Gaspé, Quebec
Paper Bag Records artists
Canadian gay musicians
Musicians from Montreal
Living people
1970s births
Year of birth uncertain